The 2008–09 KNVB Cup was the 91st season of the Dutch national football knockout tournament. The defending champions were Feyenoord. The competition started on 30 August 2008 and ended with sc Heerenveen winning the Final in Rotterdam on 17 May 2009.

Clubs
Participating clubs in the 2008–09 KNVB Cup by province:

1Note: First numbers denote Rd1 winners; second numbers denote Rd2 entrants.

Results
The first and second round draw was made on July 8, 2008 in Zeist, KNVB headquarters.

First round
The First Round featured 48 amateur teams: 35 Hoofdklasse clubs, 12 clubs from the 4th or lower levels and 2 reserve teams. 24 of the Hoofdklasse clubs qualified for the competition through their league performance during the previous season (top 4 of each Hoofdklasse), while the other half of the teams competing in the First Round secured their place through the 2007–08 KNVB District Cups. The matches were played on August 30 and 31, 2008.

|}

Second round

The 24 winners from the First Round, together with 2 youth teams (winners of youth league and cup) and all clubs from both the Eredivisie and the Eerste Divisie qualified for the Second Round. The matches were played on September 23, 24 and 25, 2008.

Participants:

|}
(A) denotes amateur club

Third round
The winners the Second Round matches progressed to the Third Round. The matches were played on November 11, 12 and 13, 2008.

Participants:

|}
(A) denotes amateur club1The match was played in Emmen.

Fourth round
The Fourth Round was played on January 20, 21 and 28, 2009. With Feyenoord losing to Heerenveen 3-0, it marked the first time in 27 years and the third time ever in the KNVB Cup where any of the Big Three teams failed to reach the quarter-finals of the tournament.

|}
(A) denotes amateur club(1) denotes Eerste Divisie club

Quarterfinals

Semifinals

Final

References

External links
 KNVB Official website 

2008-09
2008–09 domestic association football cups
2008–09 in Dutch football